Huey Purvis Meaux (March 10, 1929 – April 23, 2011) was an American record producer and the owner of various record labels and recording studios including Crazy Cajun Records, Tribe Records, Tear Drop Records, Capri Records, and SugarHill Recording Studios (1971).

Biography
Meaux was born in Wright, Louisiana. Nicknamed "The Crazy Cajun," his credits included such hits as "She's About a Mover" by the Sir Douglas Quintet; "Treat Her Right" by Roy Head, "Are You Lonesome Tonight?" by B.J. Thomas, "Before the Next Teardrop Falls" and "Wasted Days and Wasted Nights"(1975) by Freddy Fender; "You'll Lose A Good Thing" by Barbara Lynn; "Talk To Me" by Sunny & The Sunliners; and "Big Blue Diamonds" by Gene Summers. He worked with Jerry Lee Lewis, Johnny Copeland, T-Bone Walker, Rockin' Sydney,  Lowell Fulson, Chuck Jackson, Doug Kershaw, Doug Sahm, Rod Bernard, Sonny Landreth, Clifton Chenier, Little Royal, Ronnie Milsap, Mickey Gilley, Delbert McClinton, Dr. John, Clarence "Frogman" Henry, Bob Wills, Lightnin' Hopkins, Tommy McLain, Joe Barry and Johnny Winter also.

In 1996, a police raid of his office turned up thousands of Polaroids and videos of girls, mostly underage, in sexual situations. Meaux pleaded guilty to two counts of sexual assault of a child, a drug possession charge, a child pornography charge, and another for jumping bail and briefly fleeing to Juárez, Mexico. He was sentenced to 15 years in prison and was released in 2007.

In 2010, he formed the label Freedom Express Records, and released an album by Ramon Angel Solis entitled The Mexican Side of Me.

Meaux died on April 23, 2011, aged 82.

See also
Blues
R&B

References

External links

1929 births
2011 deaths
People from Vermilion Parish, Louisiana
American entertainment industry businesspeople
Record producers from Louisiana
20th-century American businesspeople
American people convicted of child pornography offenses